Steinbusjøen is a lake in Vang Municipality in Innlandet county, Norway. It is located just east of the large lake Tyin. The lake is part of the Begna watershed and it is regulated as a reservoir for the Ylja hydroelectric power station.

The  lake has a shoreline measuring about  around.

See also
List of lakes in Norway

References

Vang, Innlandet
Lakes of Innlandet